Marcelino Martínez Cao (born 29 April 1940), known simply as Marcelino, is a Spanish retired footballer who played as a striker.

Club career
Marcelino was born in Ares, Province of A Coruña, Galicia. In 1959 he signed with Real Zaragoza from local Racing de Ferrol, going on to remain with the former club until his retirement 11 years later.

During his spell with the Aragonese, always spent in La Liga, Marcelino scored 117 official goals, contributing solidly to the conquest of three major titles, including two Copa del Rey trophies. He was part of an efficient attacking unit dubbed Los Magníficos (The Magnificent) which also featured Canário, Carlos Lapetra, Eleuterio Santos and Juan Manuel Villa.

International career
Marcelino played 14 times for the Spain national team, participating in the 1964 European Nations' Cup and the 1966 FIFA World Cup. In the former tournament he scored the decisive 2–1 in the final against the Soviet Union, through a header.

International goals

Honours

Club
Zaragoza
Copa del Generalísimo: 1963–64, 1965–66
Inter-Cities Fairs Cup: 1963–64

International
Spain
UEFA European Championship: 1964

References

External links
 
 
 

1940 births
Living people
People from Ferrol (comarca)
Sportspeople from the Province of A Coruña
Spanish footballers
Footballers from Galicia (Spain)
Association football forwards
La Liga players
Segunda División players
Racing de Ferrol footballers
Real Zaragoza players
Spain B international footballers
Spain international footballers
1964 European Nations' Cup players
1966 FIFA World Cup players
UEFA European Championship-winning players